Alenius is a surname. Notable people with the surname include:

 Ele Alenius (1925–2022), Finnish politician
 Inga Ålenius (1938–2017), Swedish actress
 Roberta Alenius (born 1978), Swedish jurist and politician

See also
 Alexius

Swedish-language surnames